Seyyedabad (also Romanized as Seyyedābād and Şeydābād) is a village in Japelaq-e Sharqi Rural District, Japelaq District, Azna County, Lorestan Province, Iran. At the 2006 census, its population was 172, in 44 families.

References 

Towns and villages in Azna County